Marin Marić (born 21 February 1994) is a Croatian professional basketball player for MoraBanc Andorra of the LEB Oro. He played college basketball in the United States for Northern Illinois and DePaul.

College career
Marić moved to the United States in 2012 to attend La Lumiere School in La Porte, Indiana. In 2013, he enrolled at Northern Illinois University and debuted for the Huskies men's basketball. An injury early in his freshman year led to him redshirting the 2013–14 season. He returned in the 2014–15 season and played three full seasons for the Huskies. In 2017, he originally declared for the NBA draft, but withdrew his name before the draft withdrawal deadline. He subsequently left Northern Illinois and joined DePaul as a graduate transfer. In his lone season at DePaul, Maric averaged 13.6 points and 6.6 rebounds per game. He had a season-high 25 points, 11 rebounds and 5 assists against St. John's on January 6, 2018.

Professional career
On 12 May 2012, Marić made his professional debut at age 18 with Split in an A-Liga game against Slavonski Brod, playing for 15 seconds.

Following the 2017–18 US college season, Marić had a two-game stint in the Turkish Basketball Super League for Büyükçekmece. For the 2018–19 season, he played in Belgium with Oostende of the Pro Basketball League (PBL). Despite him missing the back-end of the season with an elbow injury, he was crowned a champion in June 2019 when Oostende won the PBL title. He returned to Belgium for the 2019–20 season, joining Okapi Aalst. He was the PBL's MVP of Round 1 after recording 21 points and nine rebounds in a win over Leuven Bears. Marić led the league in rebounding with 8.8 rebounds per game.

On June 19, 2020, Marić signed with BC Lietkabelis of the Lithuanian Basketball League. He averaged 9.6 points and 5.6 rebounds in the EuroCup. On December 3, 2020, he signed with Split of the Adriatic League and the Croatian League, returning to the team for a second stint.

On September 19, 2021, Marić signed with Ironi Ness Ziona of the Israeli Basketball Super League. He left the team in early November. 

On December 16, 2021, Marić signed with Larisa of the Greek Basket League. In 25 league games, he averaged 11.6 points, 6.8 rebounds and 1.5 assists, playing around 20 minutes per contest.

On August 8, 2022, Marić signed with MoraBanc Andorra of the LEB Oro.

National team career
Marić made his international debut in 2012 for the Croatian national under-18 team at the FIBA Europe Under-18 Championship, where he won a gold medal. In 2013, he played for the Croatian under-19 team at the FIBA Under-19 World Championship. In 2014, he played for the Croatian under-20 team at the FIBA Europe Under-20 Championship.

References

External links
Okapi Aalst player profile
FIBA profile
Sports-Reference.com profile

1994 births
Living people
BC Lietkabelis players
BC Oostende players
Centers (basketball)
Croatian expatriate basketball people in Greece
Croatian expatriate basketball people in Israel
Croatian expatriate basketball people in Lithuania
Croatian expatriate basketball people in Turkey
Croatian expatriate basketball people in the United States
Croatian men's basketball players
DePaul Blue Demons men's basketball players
Ironi Nes Ziona B.C. players
KK Split players
La Lumiere School alumni
Larisa B.C. players
Northern Illinois Huskies men's basketball players
Okapi Aalstar players
BC Andorra players